Ortenberg is a town in the Wetteraukreis district, in Hesse, Germany. It is located 22 km east of Friedberg, and 38 km northeast of Frankfurt am Main.

Districts
Ortenberg consists of the following districts: Bergheim, Bleichenbach, Eckartsborn, Effolderbach, Gelnhaar, Lißberg, Ortenberg, Selters, Usenborn and Wippenbach.

Local council
The elections in March 2016 showed the following results: 
Seats 
SPD 13
CDU 9
FWG 6
BiO 3

References

Wetteraukreis